Achilles (minor planet designation: 588 Achilles) is a large Jupiter trojan asteroid of the Greek camp. Achilles was the first Jupiter trojan to be discovered, and was discovered by Max Wolf at the Heidelberg Observatory in 1906. Wolf named the minor planet after the legendary hero Achilles from Greek mythology. It has a rotation period of 7.3 hours and possibly a spherical shape.

Discovery 

Achilles was discovered on 22 February 1906, by the German astronomer Max Wolf at the Heidelberg-Königstuhl State Observatory in southern Germany. It was the first discovery of a Jupiter trojan, although  had been observed as  two years previously. This body, however, remained unconfirmed as the observation period was not long enough to calculate an orbit. August Kopff, a colleague of Wolf at Heidelberg, then discovered 617 Patroclus eight months after Achilles, and, in early 1907, he discovered the largest of all Jupiter trojans, 624 Hektor.

Orbit and classification 

Achilles orbits the Sun at a distance of 4.4–6.0 AU in the  Lagrangian point of the Sun–Jupiter System once every 11 years and 11 months (4,343 days; semi-major axis of 5.21 AU). Its orbit shows an eccentricity of 0.15 and an inclination of 10 degrees from the plane of the ecliptic.

Achilles is the first known example of the stable solution of the three-body problem worked out by French mathematician Joseph Lagrange in 1772, after whom the minor planet 1006 Lagrangea is named. After the discovery of other asteroids with similar orbital characteristics, which were also named after heroes from the Trojan War (see below), the term "Trojan asteroids" or "Jupiter trojans" became commonly used. In addition, a rule was established that the  point was the "Greek camp", whereas the  point was the "Trojan camp", though not before each camp had acquired a "spy" (Hektor in the Greek camp and Patroclus in the Trojan camp).

Physical characteristics

Spectral type 

In the Tholen taxonomic scheme, Achilles is classified as a D-type asteroid with an unusual spectrum (DU). Its V–I color index of 0.94 is typical for most larger Jupiter trojans (see table below).

Photometry 

Achilles rotation period of 7.3 hours is somewhat shorter than that of most other large Jupiter trojans but close to that of 911 Agamemnon, 3451 Mentor and 3317 Paris, which are similar in size (see table below). Its low brightness amplitude is indicative of a rather spherical shape. From July 2007 until September 2008, coordinated photometric observations were carried out by astronomers at Simeiz (Crimea), Rozhen (Bulgaria), Maidanak (Uzbekistan) and Kharkiv (Ukraine) observatories. Analysis of the obtained lightcurves determined a period of  hours with a brightness amplitude of 0.02–0.11 magnitude. Alternative period determinations by Cláudia Angeli (7.0 h), Robert Stephens (7.312 h), Stefano Mottola (7.32 h) and Vincenzo Zappalà (12 h) are mostly in good agreement.

Diameter and albedo 

According to the surveys carried out by the Infrared Astronomical Satellite, IRAS, the Japanese Akari satellite, and the NEOWISE mission of NASA's Wide-field Infrared Survey Explorer, the body's surface has a very low albedo in the range of 0.0328 to 0.043, making its absolute magnitude of approximately 8.57 correspond to a diameter of 130.1 to 135.5 kilometers.

Achilles is the 6th largest Jupiter trojan according to IRAS and Akari, and the 4th largest based on NEOWISE data:

Naming 

This minor planet's name was suggested by Austrian astronomer Johann Palisa. It was named after Achilles, the legendary hero from Greek mythology and central figure in Homer's Iliad which tells the accounts of the Trojan War (also see 5700 Homerus and 6604 Ilias). As an infant, Achilles was plunged in the River Styx by his mother Thetis (also see 17 Thetis), thus rendering his body invulnerable excepting the heel by which he was held. He slew Hector (see also 624 Hektor), the greatest Trojan warrior. He was eventually killed by an arrow in the heel by Paris (see 3317 Paris).

References

External links 
 Asteroid Lightcurve Database (LCDB), query form (info )
 Dictionary of Minor Planet Names, Google books
 Discovery Circumstances: Numbered Minor Planets (1)-(5000) – Minor Planet Center
 Asteroid 588 Achilles, at the Small Bodies Data Ferret
 
 

000588
Discoveries by Max Wolf
Named minor planets
000588
19060222